Birch Creek can mean:

Streams
United States
Birch Creek (Yukon River tributary), Alaska
Birch Creek (Kantishna River tributary), Alaska
Birch Creek (Menominee County, Michigan)
Birch Creek (Bourbeuse River tributary), a stream in Missouri
Birch Creek (Chouteau County, Montana), a tributary of the Missouri River
Birch Creek (Pondera County, Montana), a tributary of the Two Medicine River
Birch Creek (Umatilla River tributary), Oregon
Birch Creek (Franklin County, Idaho), a tributary of Mink Creek (Bear River), in Franklin County, Idaho in the Bear River watershed
Birch Creek (Beaver County, Utah), a tributary of South Creek

Australia
Birch Creek, Victoria a stream near Smeaton, Victoria

Canada
Birch Creek (British Columbia), a creek near the town of Atlin

Communities
Birch Creek, Alaska, United States
Birch Creek, Michigan, United States
Birch Creek, Wisconsin, United States
Birch Creek, Saskatchewan, Canada